Khoraim (also Romanized as Khorā’īm, Kharā’īm, and Kharāyem; also known as Kharem and Ḩarem) is a village in Yurchi-ye Sharqi Rural District, Kuraim District, Nir County, Ardabil Province, Iran. At the 2006 census, its population was 60, in 15 families.

References 

Tageo

Towns and villages in Nir County